Oregon Route 293 is a state highway in the north-central part of the U.S. state of Oregon. It runs from Willowdale to Antelope and is known as the Antelope Highway No. 293 (see Oregon highways and routes).

Oregon Route 293 is a post-2002 number.

Despite its odd number, Oregon Route 293 is an east–west highway. It was not signed as a state highway until at least the 1990s. It is believed that Oregon Route 293 signs were posted in error, as OR 293 has always been the internal ODOT highway number. In 2002, ODOT changed its policy to allow signing of otherwise unnumbered state highways, so Oregon Route 293 officially came into existence. Its main purpose is to connect rural Wheeler and Gilliam counties to the Bend metropolitan area. Most of Oregon Route 293 is located in Wasco County, although about a mile is in Jefferson County.

History
On October 10, 1963, there was agreement with the Oregon State Highway Commission and Wasco County to turn the Wasco County section of the Antelope Highway into a state-maintained road. The section in Jefferson County was turned into a state-maintained road on September 8, 1971. In the Oregon Transportation Commission meeting on May 14, 2002, the commission approved the OR 293 designation to be placed on the Antelope Highway.

Major intersections

See also

References

External links
 

293
Transportation in Wasco County, Oregon
Transportation in Jefferson County, Oregon